"The Other Side of Me" is a pop song written by Neil Sedaka and Howard Greenfield. Sedaka's version of the song was released on his 1973 UK album The Tra-La Days Are Over. Donny Osmond also released an album version of the song in 1973, on Alone Together, and it was the title track of Vince Hill's 1973 LP.

The song also appears on Shirley Bassey's 1975 album Good, Bad but Beautiful and Crystal Gayle's 1979 album Miss the Mississippi. Andy Williams recorded "The Other Side of Me" for his 1975 album of the same name; it was released as single and made the UK charts at #42 in March 1976.

Chart history
Andy Williams

References

External links
 
 
 

1973 songs
1976 singles
Songs written by Neil Sedaka
Neil Sedaka songs
Donny Osmond songs
Shirley Bassey songs
Crystal Gayle songs
Andy Williams songs
CBS Records singles